The corset controversy concerns supporters' and detractors' arguments for and against wearing a corset. The controversy was contemporary with the time that corsets were popular in society. Corsets, variously called a pair of bodys or stays, were worn by European women from the late 16th century onward, changing their form as fashions changed. In spite of radical change to fashion geographically and temporally, the corset or some derivative beneath an outer gown shaped the body or provided structure.

There were brief periods in which corsetry was not part of mainstream fashion. In the 1790s, there was an abrupt change to fashion as the Empire silhouette became fashionable. During the following Regency era, the highly supportive corsets of the early Georgian era were dismissed in favor of short garments worn primarily to support the breast and leave the waist and hips in their natural shape.

Beginning in the mid-1820s, women's fashion returned to the full skirts of the prior century. In a repudiation of the Empire silhouette, the waist became the central focus of female dress. The corset assumed the dominant role it held for the rest of the 19th century. Designed to emphasize the waist through minimizing it, corsets constricted the waistline in order to achieve a slender silhouette. Doctors and much of the press deplored the garment in spite of continued use.

Criticism

Wearing corsets has been subject to criticism since the era of tight lacing during the prior century. Jean-Jacques Rousseau denounced the practice in The Lancet while cartoons of the period satirized the practice. However, by the 19th century, women were writing letters to publications expressing their views directly and articulately. The one-sided denunciation of the past turned into a dialogue. Women made their voices heard, sharing their experiences and their opinions, some in favor of the corset and even tight lacing, and some in disfavor of the restrictive garment. Newspapers and popular journals became the media for the exchange of hundreds of letters and articles concerning the corset.

Known as the "corset controversy" or the "corset question", the controversy spilled over multiple publications, countries and decades. Of particular concern was the issue of tight lacing. The flow of articles and letters waxed and waned over time, reaching a crescendo in the late 1860s, which may be taken to be the peak of the frenzy. However, the issue surfaced long before and continued long afterward. Throughout this period, advertisements in the same publications promoted the sale of corsets with enthusiasm.

In the United Kingdom, publications in which the controversy raged included The Times, The Lancet, Queen, The Scotsman, Ladies Treasury, The Englishwomen's Domestic Magazine, and All the Year Round. In the United States, the Chicago Tribune commented that English journalists discussed both sides of the controversy "with very great fervor and very little common sense," though it published its own contributions. Other American newspapers and periodicals also participated, including The New York Times, The Washington Post, The Boston Globe, the Hartford Daily Courant, the North American Review, and The Saint Paul Daily Globe. Other parts of the English-speaking world joined from time to time, reprinting articles from England and America, as well as contributing their own. Even provincial newspapers such as the Amador Ledger of California, the Hobart Town Courier, the Otago Witness, and the Timaru Herald of New Zealand had their say. 

The line between wearing corsets in general and tight lacing in particular was never drawn precisely. Many detractors denounced both, obviating the distinction, while many advocates endorsed both. Additionally, many women who wore corsets denied that they tight-laced, adding confusion to the controversy. The West Coast Times wrote that "consequences of tight lacing are universally admitted," yet ladies' denial persisted. They preferred to claim that their small waist was "a gift of Nature" and that they wear a corset for "comfortable, if not necessary support."

Corsets and fashion

The dominant aesthetic of the mid-nineteenth century called for full skirts. Prior to the common wearing of the crinoline, several petticoats were worn in order to provide this fullness. A corset, used to constrict the waist and create slenderness, also accentuated a full skirt through comparison.

The Saint Paul Daily Globe wrote of corsetry:

There were countless denunciations. Fashions that required a tiny waist were deemed oppressive. One such appeared in the Chicago Tribune

Yet some women professed to enjoy the practice. A letter to the Boston Globe reads

A reader wrote to The Toronto Daily Mail insisting that only those who had experienced tight lacing could understand its pleasures

The editor of the "Women's Chats" section of the West Australian advocated "tight lacing in moderation"

A corsetiere described how women might attain the desired waist size

Medical criticism
Many doctors railed against the practice of tight lacing as decidedly harmful. Some women responded to their claims, saying that tight lacing was actually beneficial as well as enjoyable, but most women didn't agree and found tight lacing impractical since they had to work, others cited their own negative experiences with the practice. The following exchange, which took place during ten days in 1869 in the pages of The Times of London, gives a flavor of the discourse that volleyed back and forth for decades. The exchange was initiated by a note in the British medical journal, The Lancet, which was reprinted in The Times of London.

 

A reader signing herself "Not a Girl of the Period" wrote a letter to The Times in reply

A reader, signing herself "Anti-Slavery" countered

The Lancet felt compelled to reply as well, expanding on its medical arguments

Other readers wrote to extol the virtues of tight lacing

The distinguished anatomist William Henry Flower in 1881 published a book demonstrating by text and illustrations the deformities caused to female anatomy by corsets. This did not prevent his wife and four daughters from wearing them.

Mothers and daughters

Women were expected to wear corsets, and introducing daughters to the practice was considered part of a mother’s duty. Just how and when might depend on the mother, the daughter, the place, and the time. However, some things were much the same everywhere. Three examples, one from the American frontier of 1880, another from London in 1907, and a third from 1883 are variations on the theme.

Laura Ingalls Wilder was an American author who wrote a series of children's books based on her childhood in a pioneer family. Little Town on the Prairie is set in 1880 in South Dakota in an area recently settled. Despite being on the frontier, the women (and, in particular, the girls) were expected to behave according to the norms of the times. Its 1941 publication date takes it out of the "discussion" period, but as it was written as a children's book for girls, its account is unlikely to be spurious or a fantasy, so it serves as a reliable testament of some of the more curious practices such as sleeping in corsets.

The family had four daughters, Mary, Laura, Carrie, and Grace, the youngest. Mary, the eldest, tries on a dress that is found not to fit until her corset is laced more tightly, leading to the following exchange:

Readers wrote to The Gentlewoman describing personal experiences with tight lacing. For example,

In publishing this and other letters, the editor of The Gentlewoman admonished the writers:

There was no shortage of others who condemned mothers and daughters who participated in the practice. For example:

Childhood

In some cases, mothers started their daughters wearing corsets in early childhood. The New York Times described the practice in its Fashion section.<ref>"The Fashions for Summer" New York Times", (26 June 1881)</ref>

An account from a young lady reads:

Mothers wrote letters describing their version of the practice. The following, published in the English periodical Queen, is typical.

Another letter, in the Boston Globe, is similar:

Teenage years
Mothers typically put their daughters into serious corsets in their teens or sometimes in the pre-teens. Some were uncertain as to when and how to begin tight lacing. They sought advice in their local newspapers, giving rise to heated discussions. One such exchange took place in the pages of the Toronto Daily Mail, from April to June 1883, in the Saturday section, "Women's Kingdom".

A reader signing herself, "Corset", inquired:

The next Saturday, "Staylace" offered her experience:

A few weeks later, "Staylace" submitted excerpts from her niece's diary from the prior year.

Girls would seek relief from their stays at night and mothers would seek to prevent it. One reader, signing herself "Mother", wrote

"Kingston" offered her remedy:

"Common Sense" offered her own alternative:

Other readers took strong exception to these extreme measures. One expressed her indignation, while describing her own daughter's wearing corsets from the age of eleven, but in the 'daytime only':

Another objected entirely to corsets until the very end of the teens:

Other newspapers carried similar accounts. In fashionable London, tight lacing of teen aged daughters was a serious affair. The New York Times wrote:

School
In fashionable society, a girl was expected to have a suitably small waist. Girls' schools were preparation for society and some headmistresses treated that attainment as part of the girls' schooling. As the girl was not yet an adult, her opinion was not considered. A reader wrote to the editors of The Science of Health describing her experience.

The West Australian printed excerpts from the diary of a school girl describing how figure training was accomplished.

How I shall be able to eat and move about I can't think; but Madge O—, who left last term, and who was that size, said you feel awfully smart, and, in fact rather a pleasant sensation when you get used to the pulling in.

Three letters form a thread that illustrates the volleying back and forth. The first was written by a mother, surprised that the school acted on its own.

The daughter herself continued the account. Rather than deplore the practice, her remarkable conclusion was that tight lacing should be started at an early age.

A woman signing herself as a schoolmistress defended the practice as an "elegant article of dress". Her solution agreed with that of the young lady, commencing the practice at an early age.

One young lady looked back upon the practice with affection. Today, one might read these accounts with skepticism, but contemporary advertisements describe corsets as small as 15 inches.

That tight-lacing was enjoyable is a recurring theme. For example:

Others were proud of their training and saw it as the source of a fine accomplishment;

However, other young ladies recalled the practice with little fondness.

Marriage
There are many articles admonishing girls to abjure the custom of tight lacing and assuring them that no man they would want to marry had any interest in small waists. Typical of these is:

Another, entitled "The Absurdity of the Custom as Well as the Effect upon the Health of Slaves to the Fashion", begins:

Other articles suggested more dire consequences. A "Doctor Lewis" wrote

Whatever the doctors might say, young ladies would lace down in preparation for their wedding, as evidenced by contemporary photographs. Moreover, some women laced down after their marriage to please husbands who fancied the practice. One such wife wrote:

These, with the assistance of my maid, I put on, and managed the first day to lace my waist in to eighteen inches.

A ladies maid recounted a similar situation:

A husband who fancied the practice wrote:

Fashion establishments
Girls working in "fashion establishments", as they were then called, wore corsets to suit the dictates of their employers. Tiny waists were required of employees to sell the then current fashions, much as size zero models are frequently used in fashion shows today.

The editor of "The Ladies Page" of The Western Mail wrote

 In a large establishment in the West End of London the standard is 19 inches, and any assistant who does not reach those dimensions within six months of her engagement is discharged. The person in charge of the girls' figures at this shop gave as her experience that out of every 100 girls she found three could not lace at all, six laced with difficulty, eight eventually gave up, ten endured the bondage, seventy really enjoyed it, and three laced excessively. At the time of admission, out of a hundred girls, three had 24 in. waists, six had 23 in., 18 had 22 in., 45 had 21 in., and two had 19 in. At the end of six months, by "judicious lacing," whatever that may mean, the figures were – 21 in. two; 20 in. six; 19 in. seventy five; 18 in. eleven; 17 in four; 16 in. two.

Fashion establishments were much the same in Paris:

 ... some five and a half years ago the following advertisement caught my eye in the “Wanted” columns of a high-class ladies’ newspaper, I at once answered it. It ran as follows: —

 'WANTED, at once, a young lady, pretty, tall (good figure essential), as “model” in a showroom of a well-known Paris couturiere. A slight knowledge of French desirable. Apply, with full particulars as to height, etc., and recent photograph, etc.'

 It had become necessary, owing to the death of my father, for me to do what my relatives with whom I went to live called “something.” In reply to my letter I was asked to call at an hotel, and after an interview with the principal proprietor and his forewoman, who was a bright and clever Parisian, I was engaged at a very good salary.

 A little less than a week later saw me at my post. I soon found that I was to be treated very much in the light of a good-looking, animated automaton. I was told that, though my figure was superb, my waist—which, as it measured about 20in, I had considered reasonably small—was too large, and that consequently, ere I was fitted for the dresses which were to be supplied for my wear, I must visit Léoty and obtain a couple of corsets which would reduce my waist to a trifle less than 18in. This I did, the firm defraying the cost, and I must confess that, though the waist-forming process was not pleasant at first, I was not a little proud of what was referred to as my beautiful figure. Nearly all the hands in the various ateliers and showrooms tight-laced. One girl, a pretty American who was much admired by customers and their male escorts, measured less than 17in over her dress. Several were barely sixteen, and it was to this latter size that I was told I should ultimately be required to reduce myself. I very soon got accustomed to the tight-lacing, and became as anxious as my employers that I should possess a fine figure, which the beautifully, though plainly, made dresses with which X—et Cie. supplied me showed off to perfection.

 Within a year of my coming to Paris I possessed the 16in waist desired by my employers, and was admittedly the finest figure in the showroom, in which I was chief model. Amongst our clientele, which comprised many of the smartest, richest and most beautiful women in the French capital, and also many smart Americans, there were, many who openly envied me my good looks, and—from a fashionable point of view—superb figure.

The practice was described by a shopgirl:

 When I first accepted my situation, my waist was twenty inches. My mistress informed me that I would have to lace for the benefit of her customers and that I also must agree to sleep in her house.

 When I was ready to retire on the first night, mistress came and took my corsets away, and next morning she brought me a pair which were only 18 inches. She made me put them on and said that she would lace them in herself. I did as she told me and I had to stand with the other girls employed in the establishment while she laced me in. I did not like it at first, standing in a row with my hair hanging down, waiting for the mistress to come and lace me in, but of course I soon got used to it as all the other girls had to do. I was never allowed to dress myself until the mistress had laced me in ...

 One morning, I was sent for and found that three other girls besides myself had been called. We learned that we were to wear 16 inch corsets. At first I rebelled, but the mistress coaxed me ... When night came, I was glad, for I though I would be able to take the corsets off. Judge of my dismay when the mistress informed me that I would have to sleep in these corsets. Next morning as we stood in line, she measured our waist and told us we would have to continue sleeping in these corsets. Once a week, she said that we could be allowed to take them off. At last the time came for us to take them off and what a relief that was. In a short time, however, they were put back on again and laced in smaller than ever. ... At last, though, I got so that the sixteen inch corset would lace up tight and I knew I was a successful model. ...

 Now I am proud of myself. Mistress has gotten me so that my waist is only fifteen inches. My corsets, too, are well laced together. Everybody admires my little waist ... I am not sorry that I am a model as after all I have gone through I am well looked after my mistress, and if she were to ask me to put on smaller corsets, I would do so.

Various writers condemned the practice, for example:

 Now there is one practice which is painfully common among all classes, and that is the use of the "locked corset". This is practically a steel corset, with a waist varying from about 14in to 16in. Into this the growing girl is compressed by force, the corset is shut tight and secured by a lock, the key being kept by the mother or whoever is responsible for the proceeding.

 It may be observed here that it is the usual practice for the heads of "trying on" departments in large dress-making and mantle-making establishments to require all girls engaged in "trying on" to enter one of these corsets, which is locked, and the key kept by the head. In the case of the growing girl, the object is to prevent the waist from growing as the rest of the body develops, and the idea is really only worthy of Chinese cruelty.

 In the case of the shop girl, the object is to "preserve" the figure precisely at the exact amount of compression which is supposed to I show off ladies' garments to the best advantage. In any case, the girl is confined in this way by the middle, night and day. She has to sleep in her "little ease" if she can, and the torture is such that at first even the shopgirl, worn out with the fatigues of the day, can hardly sleep for the pain.

 Probably nothing can be done until all women are sufficiently sensible, to realize that there is no beauty in a wasp's waist, that the majority of men do not really care a bit about it, and that there is real danger in tight-lacing, but surely the dreadful events which have happened lately ought to do something to emancipate schoolgirls and debutantes from their perpetual imprisonment in locked corsets. Elder women who compress on their own account are responsible for their own folly, but something ought to be done to put an end to this form of girl-torture.

Another wrote:

 Girls in the more fashionable London stores make the most amazing statements in reference to dress regulations. They are compelled to compress their waists to a wasp-line slimness to show off the "creations" to the best advantage.

 The girls are expected to be living fashion plates," says the editor of a London trade paper. "They must have all the elegance of willowy style and lissome, grace of figure, without which they are no good in the service.

 The editor above referred to a letter from a girl in one of the most fashionable stores, and she makes this alarming statement: "The girls are laced up till they are nearly cut in two. Locked corsets are used, the key being kept by the manageress, and the corsets being worn night and day."

 In reply to a letter of remonstrance, the firm stated that it had certain regulations in regard to dress and other matters, and that no girl ever objected in the least to tight lacing.

One such shop girl certainly had her objections:

 It is only two months ago that my employer insisted upon my reducing my waist from 16in to 14in, on the ground that she must have a model to show the newest fashions on. How could I refuse? I know many girls who would lace their waist till they fainted to get a good situation. And so to please these ladies, I am locked day and night into a vise which hardly allows me to breathe.

The dress reform movement

Advocates of dress reform deplored the impractical and restrictive fashions of the time. The bloomer dress was a mid-century attempt at rational clothing for women. It attracted considerable ridicule in the press and relatively few adopters. Other attempts at dress reform fared no better.

Various dress reformers turned to the printing press. In 1873, Elizabeth Stuart Phelps Ward wrote:

Louisa May Alcott devoted Chapter 18 ("Fashion and Physiology") of her 1875 young adult fiction, Eight Cousins, to advocating for dress reform in the form of the "freedom suit," which is described as being different from and more socially acceptable than bloomers. The young main character, Rose Campbell, is under the guardianship of her physician uncle Alec. However, her aunt Clara wishes Rose to dress appropriately to her position as an heiress, and one day gives her a fashionable outfit to try. Rose ultimately rejects it in favor of Alec's freedom suit, consisting of close-fitting pantaloons and shirt under a long-skirted petticoat and dress. Earlier in the novel, Rose had been wearing a tight belt to keep her waist small, which Alec insisted she stop doing for the sake of her health (Chapter 5, "A Belt and a Box"). When Clara tries to convince her to wear a corset, Alec is furious.

 He closed the door with a shrug, but before anyone could speak, his quick eye fell upon an object which caused him to frown, and demand in an indignant tone, "After all I have said, were you really going to tempt my girl with those abominable things?"

 "I thought we put them away when she wouldn't wear them," murmured Mrs. Clara, whisking a little pair of corsets out of sight with guilty haste. "I only brought them to try, for Rose is growing stout, and will have no figure if it is not attended to soon," she added, with an air of calm conviction that roused the Doctor still more, for this was one of his especial abominations.

 "Growing stout! Yes, thank Heaven, she is, and shall continue to do it, for Nature knows how to mold a woman better than any corset-maker, and I won't have her interfered with. My dear Clara, have you lost your senses that you can for a moment dream of putting a growing girl into an instrument of torture like this?" and with a sudden gesture he plucked forth the offending corsets from under the sofa cushion, and held them out with the expression one would wear on beholding the thumbscrews or the rack of ancient times.

 "Don't be absurd, Alec. There is no torture about it, for tight lacing is out of fashion, and we have nice, sensible things nowadays. Everyone wears them; even babies have stiffened waists to support their weak little backs," began Mrs. Clara, rushing to the defense of the pet delusion of most women.

 "I know it, and so the poor little souls have weak backs all their days, as their mothers had before them. It is vain to argue the matter, and I won't try, but I wish to state, once for all, that if I ever see a pair of corsets near Rose, I'll put them in the fire, and you may send the bill to me."

But dress reform had little mainstream impact. Fashion continued to emphasize the waist and, so long as it did, the corset continued to be regarded as an indispensable of dress. An unusually perceptive reformer described the situation in an address to the National Christian League in 1895. Her speech was reported in The New York Times:

 WOMEN'S SLAVERY TO FASHION – She Admires Ideal Garments but will not Wear Them

 Mrs. Margaret Stanton Lawrence ... told of the artist who spent years in inventing a dress for woman that would be at once comfortable, convenient, and beautiful. Success crowned his efforts, but alas! who would invent the woman to wear this ideal garment! The dress was delightful, all women admitted, and filled every requirement, but – alas again for them! their husbands would not walk in the streets with the wearers of such a garb, their fashionable friends begged to be spared the visits of such unconventional creatures, and the clergymen in the churches asked that their congregations be not disturbed by thoughts of a woman's dress.

It seemed that change would be glacially slow at best. A year later, The New York Times'' wrote:

 FOR THE LIBERATED WOMEN; THOSE VALIANT ONES WHO WILL GIVE UP THE BINDING CORSET. More and More Women Are Doffing Their Stays – But It Still Takes High Courage to Join Their Ranks.

 The receipt of several letters asking The Times to give some designs suitable for making up gowns to be worn without corsets has suggested the article here presented. The leaven is working among women: Many have discarded them, many more, mothers, who feel that it is too late for them to change, are persuading their growing daughters to omit their adoption. ... Human nature is weak, very weak, when it comes to the question of personal appearance, and having for generations adopted the standard of a tapering waist as a mark of feminine beauty of figure, it is going to take character, perseverance, religion even to counteract this. ...

 "One of the most pathetic speeches that I have listened to in a long time", said a woman recently, "was that made by a friend to me the other day. We were discussing hygienic dress and the use of disuse of corsets. I remarked casually and tritely that it took a good deal of moral courage to give them up. 'Moral courage!' she repeated, 'it takes wrestling with the Lord. There is no plea I have made oftener of my Heavenly Father than that He would give me strength to persevere in this thing'".

End of the controversy

From 1908 to 1914, the fashionable narrow-hipped and narrow-skirted silhouette necessitated the lengthening of the corset at its lower edge. A new type of corset covered the thighs and changed the position of the hip, making the waist appear higher and wider. The new fashion was considered uncomfortable, cumbersome, and furthermore required the use of strips of elastic fabric. The development of rubberized elastic materials in 1911 helped the girdle replace the corset. This was the huge turnaround for the history of the waist trainer.

The corset controversy changed in the early 20th century when the world of fashion circled back to styles reminiscent of the Empire silhouette. Fashionable dress was fluid and soft, with flowing lines. What rational dress reform was unable to accomplish in decades of rhetoric, the wheel of changing fashion brought about almost overnight. The waist became unimportant and the waist-restricting corset lost its significance.

Paul Poiret was a leader in this movement. He replaced the corset with the hobble skirt, which, while equally restrictive, was different and thus readily adopted in an era eager for change. In his autobiography, Poiret wrote

 It was in the name of Liberty that I proclaimed the fall of the corset and the adoption of the brassiere, which since then, has won the day. Yes, I freed the bust, but I shackled the legs.

The hobble skirt lasted but a few years, but its adoption marked the beginning of the end. Other designers such as Madeleine Vionnet, Mariano Fortuny, and Coco Chanel soon followed with simple comfortable fashions that freed the entire woman. With their adoption into mainstream fashion, the corset controversy receded into a historical curiosity while the controversy about bras had just begun.

See also
History of corsets
Hourglass corset
Tightlacing
Victorian dress reform
Victorian fashion
Wasp waist
Swedish Dress Reform Society

References

External links
That Waist - Photo editing at the turn of the century

19th-century fashion
Corsetry
Fashion
History of clothing (Western fashion)
Clothing controversies